Partick Thistle Women's Football Club, formerly known as Thistle Weir Ladies Football Club, is a Scottish women's football club based in the city of Glasgow. It has been the women's section of Partick Thistle since 2013. The club currently plays in the Scottish Women's Premier League, the top division of women's football in Scotland.

History 
Thistle Weir Ladies Football Club was officially founded as part of the Thistle Weir Academy in 2014, having previously existed as part of the Charitable Trust for one year prior to that. On 22 October 2018, because the top two teams in the SWFL 1 South (Hibernian U23s and Celtic Academy) were not eligible for promotion as subsidiaries of top division clubs, third-placed Thistle Weir were promoted to the Scottish Women's Premier League 2.

On 23 January 2019, the club rebranded as Partick Thistle Women's Football Club. In September 2020, a new management team made up of three Partick Thistle professional men's team players was appointed, with Brian Graham as manager, in what the club believed was the first arrangement of its kind.

Partick initially failed to gain promotion from the SWPL2 in 2020–21, finishing in 3rd, but were invited to join the top division when Forfar Farmington resigned their place just before the new season began.  With an expansion of the SWPL at end of 2021–22 (announced in April 2022) including no relegation, it would mean at least one more season for the Jags in the highest tier.

Stadium 
The club previously played its home games at the Glasgow City Council-owned Petershill Park in the Springburn area of Glasgow. Due to the ground being closed during the COVID-19 pandemic, matches during the 2020–21 season are being played at Lochinch, the police sports club facility located within Pollok Park.

Players

Current squad

Out on loan

Records

Year-by-year
.

Source: Soccerway

References

External links 
 Official website

Women's football clubs in Scotland
Scottish Women's Premier League clubs
Partick Thistle F.C.
Football clubs in Glasgow
Association football clubs established in 2013
2013 establishments in Scotland
Springburn
Maryhill
Scottish Women's Football League clubs